The Cody Circuit of Britain biplane, also known as the Cody III, was the third powered aircraft built by Samuel Franklin Cody. It was flown by him in various competitions during 1911, including the Daily Mail Circuit of Britain competition in which Cody was the only British contestant to complete the course.  On 29 October Cody set a new British endurance record in the aircraft, flying for five hours and fifteen minutes.

Design
Developed from his Michelin Cup winning machine of 1910 and using the same  Green engine the Cody Circuit of Britain biplane was a pusher biplane with a single frontal elevator supported by booms at the centre and either end and two rear-mounted rudders, each supported by a boom at top and bottom and fitted with a small horizontal fixed stabiliser. The tail was the most obvious difference between this aircraft and its predecessor. Like the Michelin Cup aircraft, it had a tricycle undercarriage with an added long rear skid and distinctive wheels mounted on each lower wingtip.

Operational history

The Circuit of Britain biplane made its maiden flight on 13 July 1911.

The aircraft, flown by Cody, was entered for the Daily Mail Circuit of Britain race: Cody came fourth, his aircraft being the only British aircraft to complete the 1,010 mile course.
Cody won second place in the Manville Prize contest with a flight of 2 hours 16 minutes.
On 11 September Cody won the British Empire Michelin Cup No.2 flying the Circuit of Britain biplane, with a  cross-country flight lasting 3 h 6 min 30 s, being the only competitor to finish the course.
On 29 October Cody won the British Empire Michelin Cup No.1, covering  over a closed circuit at Laffan's Plain in 5 h 15 min, a new British duration record.

On 3 July 1912 the aircraft was severely damaged on landing when Major H.D. Harvey-Kelly clipped a tree with one wingtip and crashed. Cody, who was instructing Harvey-Kelly, was severely injured in the crash. The airframe was subsequently cannibalised to build the Cody V with which Cody won the 1912 Military Aeroplane Competition held at Larkhill on Salisbury Plain.

Specifications

See also

Notes

References

 Lewis, P British Aircraft 1809-1914. London: Putnam 1962

1910s British experimental aircraft
Circuit of Brit
Biplanes
Single-engined pusher aircraft
Aircraft first flown in 1911